Blank page may refer to:

An intentionally blank page in printing
about:blank

Art
The Blank Page, a 1967 painting by René Magritte

Books
The Blank Page, a 1974 crime novel by K.C. Constantine

Film and TV
"The Blank Page", an episode of Strangers with Candy

Music

Songs
"Blank Page", a 2012 song by Christina Aguilera
"Blank Page", a song by The Smashing Pumpkins from their 1998 album Adore
"White Blank Page", a song by Mumford and Sons from their 2009 album Sigh No More
"Blank Pages" (Patricia Conroy song), a 1992 song

See also
 Emptiness (disambiguation)